George Davis (February 4, 1906 – November 25, 1957) was an American fiction editor and novelist.

Early life
As the youngest of five boys (the eldest sibling, a sister, died of diphtheria before he was born) George Davis was born on February 4, 1906, in Chicago to parents who had migrated from Canada so that George's father could work as a pharmacist for a cousin who owned a pharmacy on Clark Street on the near north side.  While working in the pharmacy at night, George's ambitious father went to medical school by day and graduated from the University of Illinois' College of Physicians and Surgeons of Chicago on June 4, 1909, with 3 year old George watching from the front row, in his mother's lap, with his four brothers and several cousins alongside.  (George always said he remembered this clearly.)

After George's father completed a one-year general surgery and obstetrics/gynecology residency in 1910 he bought a medical practice from a retiring country doctor in Clinton, Michigan, a small farming community southwest of Ann Arbor in the Irish Hills, and moved his family there in November of that same year.  George was a precocious student and a voracious reader, with a talent for writing which was immediately seen by his teachers.  His doting mother began collecting his earliest writings after a teacher sent his first poem to a newspaper for publication when he was in the fourth grade.

Before the United States entered World War I in 1917 his oldest brother, Harold, joined the Canadian Expeditionary Force and left for the battlefields of France where he served as a motorcycle courier, traveling between the command in the rear and the front lines, often through enemy territory.  His letters home captivated his brothers. After America entered the War the family moved to Highland Park in 1918, a city in the center of Detroit. Shortly afterwards The Great Influenza Pandemic of 1918-1919 began and George's family were keen observers as his father was gone from the home nearly every night treating the sick for months, many of whom were housed in tents, coming home only to eat or for a change of clothes before heading out again.

George was enrolled in the Tilden Elementary School in 1918 by then and, an insatiable reader, was no longer interested in juvenile books so his father obtained special permission for George to read adult literature, after which he haunted the libraries, reading a book a day.  He quickly established himself as able to absorb and remember any book as fast as he could turn the pages.  He graduated from Tilden in 1919 and enrolled in Central High School.

At about that time his brother Harold returned from the War with a French war bride, Marguerite d'Hyevre, whose French husband had been killed at Verdun, and whose young son also came over from Paris within a year.  Marguerite adored George and they were inseparable as George learned French at her knee as easily as he had learned to speak English.  He spoke French without an accent by the time he graduated from high school in 1923.  He then entered City College (now Wayne State University) but was too restless to continue and left for Chicago, where he worked in the office of a steel company before taking a job in Marshall Field's book department. In December 1926 George returned to Highland Park to seek permission and funds from his father to go to Paris and join the growing post-war community of American expatriate writers and artists.

Literary career

The Opening of a Door
His only novel, The Opening of a Door, was published in 1931.  He intended for it to unmask the hypocrisy and tragedy of midwestern middle-class life.  The critic, Clifton Fadiman, wrote that "the smoothness of the prose, the unity of the tone. . . are all the marks of a practiced craftsman.  It is one of the most unfirstish first novels I have ever read.  It is difficult to believe it is the work of one so young."  Davis was twenty-four when the novel was published by Harper Brothers, and it became one of the most critically acclaimed novels of 1931.

Editorialship
He served as fiction editor of the periodical Harper's Bazaar from the years 1936 to 1941. After being fired from Harper's, he served as an editor for Mademoiselle for eight years. A 
flamboyant genius and  homosexual, he is noted for bringing serious literature to the generally light world of woman's magazines. He was an early sponsor of such diverse literary figures as Truman Capote, Ray Bradbury, Jane Bowles, and Robert Lowry.

February House
Davis and several friends, including Gypsy Rose Lee, founded an art commune at 7 Middagh Street in Brooklyn Heights in October 1940. Dubbed February House by Anaïs Nin because so many of its residents had February birthdays, the house became a hub of cultural activities in New York. Figures like Benjamin Britten, W. H. Auden and Carson McCullers were live-in guests. A study of 7 Middagh Street, entitled February House, was published in 2005.

Death
He died of a heart attack in Berlin, where he had been helping his wife, singer Lotte Lenya, make recordings.

Davis in literature
A literary satire of George Davis was written by Truman Capote in the form of the character "Boaty" in his unfinished  work Answered Prayers.

References

Clarke, Gerald. Capote: A Biography. Carroll & Graf, 2005.
Tippins, Sherill. February House: The Story of W. H. Auden, Carson McCullers, Jane and Paul Bowles, Benjamin Britten, and Gypsy Rose Lee, Under One Roof In Wartime America. Houghton Mifflin, 2005.

American print editors
21st-century American novelists
1906 births
1957 deaths
Writers from Chicago
20th-century American novelists
American male novelists
20th-century American male writers
21st-century American male writers